Naylor is a statistical area in central Hamilton in New Zealand.

This is not really a suburb at all but a region defined by the statistics department. It is not in use around Hamilton.

See also
Suburbs of Hamilton, New Zealand

Suburbs of Hamilton, New Zealand